Mihailo Poček (born May 18, 1960), sometimes also Mihajlo, is a Serbian basketball coach and former player.

Playing career 
Poček played for his hometown team Metalac. He made his Yugoslav First League debut during the 1976–77 season. In 1987, he retired.

In 1990, three years after retirement, Poček signed for his hometown-based team Omladinac.

National team career 
Poček was a member of the Yugoslavia junior national team that won the bronze medal at the 1978 European Championship for Juniors. Over three tournament games, he averaged 3.7 points per game. Also, he was a member of the cadet national team that won silver medal at the 1977 European Championship for Cadets. Over seven tournament games, he averaged 6.0 points per game.

Coaching career 
In May 2000, Poček became a head coach for the Slovenian team Hopsi Polzela. In August 2002, Poček became a head coach for the Kumanovo of the Macedonian League. He had two stints with Koper (Slovenia) and Ugljevik-based Rudar (Bosnia and Herzegovina).

In September 2015, Poček became a head coach for the BLK Slavia Praha of the Czech Women's Basketball League.

On September 27, 2016, Poček was named the head coach for the Metalac of the Basketball League of Serbia. He left Metalac on September 27, 2019.

Personal life 
His son is Velibor (born 1986).

References

External links
 Coach Profile at eurobasket.com
 Coach Profile at realgm.com
 Sportski spomenar #513

1960 births
Living people
KK Metalac coaches
KK Metalac Valjevo players
Serbian men's basketball coaches
Serbian expatriate basketball people in Bosnia and Herzegovina
Serbian expatriate basketball people in Slovenia
Serbian expatriate basketball people in the Czech Republic
Serbian expatriate basketball people in North Macedonia
Serbian men's basketball players
Sportspeople from Valjevo
Yugoslav men's basketball players
Yugoslav basketball coaches
Point guards